George Cope (February 4, 1855 – January 15, 1929) was an American painter who specialized in landscapes and still lifes. His works are held in the permanent collections of the Art Institute of Chicago and the Brandywine River Museum of Art.

Life
Cope was born in West Chester, Pennsylvania, to parents Lydia (Eldridge) Cope and Caleb Swayne Cope. He moved to Philadelphia and married Theodora Blair, in 1883. They had two children.

Career
Cope trained with Hermann Herzog and specialized in painting landscapes and still lifes. Between 1879 and 1882, he traveled around the American West. After he returned to Philadelphia, he taught art at Darlington Seminary.

Notable collections
Civil War Regalia of Major Levi Gheen McCauley, 1887, oil on canvas, in the collection of the Art Institute of Chicago
Indian Relics, 1891, oil on canvas, in the collection of the Brandywine River Museum of Art
The Hunters Equipment (The Hunters Yellow Jacket), 1891, oil on canvas, in the collection of the Brandywine River Museum
Cope's Bridge, 1896, oil on canvas, in the collection of the Brandywine River Museum

References

1855 births
1929 deaths
People from West Chester, Pennsylvania
19th-century American painters
American male painters
20th-century American painters
19th-century American male artists
20th-century American male artists